IXE-13 is a 1971 Canadian spy comedy film, written and directed by Jacques Godbout.

Made in conjunction with the sketch comedy troupe Les Cyniques, the film stars André Dubois as Jean "IXE-13" Thibault, the "Ace of Canadian Spies", who sets off to save his fiancée Gisèle after she is kidnapped while IXE-13 is on a mission. Louise Forestier also stars in a dual role as both Gisèle and Taya, the "Queen of the Chinese Communists" who undergoes plastic surgery to look like Gisèle as part of her plot to get close enough to IXE-13 to kill him. Its cast also includes Serge Grenier, Marc Laurendeau, Marcel Saint-Germain, Louisette Dussault, Carole Laure and Luce Guilbeault.

The film was based on Paul Daignault's Les Aventures étranges de l'Agent IXE-13 series of pulp spy stories.

The film premiered theatrically in late 1971, before opening commercially in January 1972.

References

External links

1971 films
1971 comedy films
Canadian comedy films
Canadian spy films
National Film Board of Canada films
Films directed by Jacques Godbout
1970s spy comedy films
1970s French-language films
French-language Canadian films
1970s Canadian films